Azab (also Romanized as A‘ẕab; also known as Azibi and O‘īz̄eb) is a village in Qaleh Chenan Rural District, in the Central District of Karun County, Khuzestan Province, Iran. At the 2006 census, its population was 32, in 4 families.

References 

Populated places in Karun County